Murray Valley National Park is a national park in the Riverina region of New South Wales, Australia.

The park consists of several former state forests  and together with the Barmah National Park on the Victorian side of the Murray River comprises the largest stand of Red river gum forest in Australia.

The park was established in July 2010 and is administered by the National Parks and Wildlife Service.

This unique ecosystem is a habitat for 60 endangered native animal species and 40 endangered plant species.

Murray Valley National Park is a traditional Aboriginal country and represents a significant cultural and historical heritage.

Gallery

See also
 Protected areas of New South Wales
 Barmah National Park

References

External links
National Parks and Wildlife site

National parks of New South Wales
Protected areas established in 2010
Murray River
Riverina
2010 establishments in Australia